Spartina townsendii (or Townsend's cordgrass) is a species of flowering plant in the family Poaceae. It is native to Western Europe.

History 
The species was first described in 1870 by Frederick Townsend.

Taxonomy 
Cordgrass is believed to be a hybrid species between a female S. alterniflora and a male S. stricta.

By analysing root-tip cells, this plant was found to have 126 chromosomes.

Conservation 
Townsend's cordgrass has been introduced to different places, such as Holland because of its ability to prevent coastal erosion and to be easily propagated. However, it is reported to be an invasive species in Australia.

References 

Flora of England
townsendii